Tish is a feminine given name and nickname, and an uncommon surname. 

Tish may also refer to:
 Tish (Hasidic celebration), a Hasidic gathering of Hassidim around their Rebbe
 Tish (film), a 1942 American film
 TISH, a Canadian poetry newsletter